Minimum Rate Pricing, Inc. (MRP) was a long-distance telecommunications carrier, based out of Cedar Grove, New Jersey, started by Thomas Salzano.

Minimum Rate Pricing became the number 7 long-distance carrier in the United States within four years from its start-up, with over 1.9 million long-distance customers in 1998.

Minimum Rate Pricing was accused of slamming customers (changing rate plans without notice). Under a consent decree agreement with the Federal Communications Commission (FCC), Minimum Rate Pricing agreed to voluntarily pay $1.2 million to the FCC in a settlement without any admission of liability.

Minimum Rate Pricing subsequently eliminated its switch-back provisions, but the FCC continued its investigation into other slamming-related issues concerning Minimum Rate Pricing's business and marketing practices.

The company went bankrupt in 1999, owing WorldCom and Access Capital $67 million. Thomas Salzano later started Norvergence with his brother, Peter Salzano which also went bankrupt, amid widespread charges of fraud.

See also
Norvergence

References

 Federal Communications Commission, Consent decree
 Iowa Department of Justice, Attorney General Tom Miller Announces $1 million Settlement with Long Distance Slammer
 Florida Public Service Commission, Initiation of show cause proceedings against MRP Inc. for violation of Rule 25.4-118, F.A.C. Interexchange Carrier Selection
 fcc.gov, MINIMUM RATE PRICING TO PAY $1.2 MILLION TO U.S. TREASURY AND CHANGE ITS BUSINESS PRACTICES"
 State of Tennessee, "PROCEEDINGS AGAINST MINIMUM RATE PRICING INC."
 Long, Josh. Phone+, 1 November 2004. Been There, Done That - NorVergence Predecessor Shares Traits with Bankrupt Firm. Accessed 28 April 2010.

Companies based in Essex County, New Jersey